Spare Parts is a 2003 Slovenian drama film directed by Damjan Kozole.

Plot
Two human traffickers from a small town in Slovenia transport illegal migrants from Croatia to Western Europe, for a hefty fee.

Reception
According to The Guardian, "Slovenian writer-director Damjan Kozole has given us one of the most powerful and provocative movies of the year". 2008 Sight & Sound ranked Spare Parts among ten most important films of the “New Europe”.

References

External links 

2003 drama films
2003 films
Slovenian drama films